Cyrano may refer to:

Astronomy
 3582 Cyrano, a small main belt asteroid
 Cyrano (crater), a lunar impact crater that lies on the far side of the Moon

Stage and film
 Cyrano (Damrosch), a 1913 opera by Walter Damrosch
 Cyrano, a 1958 musical by David Shire and Richard Maltby, Jr.
 Cyrano (musical), a 1973 musical with music by Michael J. Lewis, libretto and lyrics by Anthony Burgess
 Cyrano: The Musical, a 1991 Dutch musical by Ad van Dijk
 Cyrano (opera), a 2007 opera by David DiChiera
 Cyrano, a 2018 musical by Erica Schmidt, starring Peter Dinklage
 Cyrano (film), a 2021 American-British film adaptation of the musical
Cyrano de Bergerac (disambiguation), several plays, films and TV series

Other uses
 Cyrano (genus) a damselfly genus of the family Chlorocyphidae
 Cyrano, a type of radar of the Dassault Mirage fighter aircraft

See also
 Cyrano Agency, a 2010 Korean film
 Cyrano Jones, a Star Trek character who deals in tribbles
 Cyranoid, a person who is instructed by radio as to what to say